Leacock may refer to:

Places
Leacock Township, Lancaster County, Pennsylvania, USA
Leacock Regional Park in Casula, south-west of Sydney, Australia

Surname
 Christopher Leacock (born 1978), Trinidadian DJ and music producer better known as Jillionaire
Dean Leacock (born 1984), English professional footballer
Edward Leacock (1853–1927), English-born real estate speculator and political figure in Manitoba
Eleanor Leacock (1922–1987), anthropologist and social theorist
Ernie Leacock (1906–1977), professional ice hockey defender
Hamble James Leacock (1795–1856), African missionary
Matt Leacock, Board game designer
Philip Leacock (1917–1990), English television and film director and producer
Richard Leacock (1921–2011), British-born documentary film director, pioneer of Direct Cinema and Cinéma vérité
Robin Melanie Leacock, documentary filmmaker, directed It Girls, A Passion For Giving & I'll Take Manhattan
St Clair Leacock, member of parliament in Saint Vincent and the Grenadines
Stephen Leacock, FRSC (1869–1944), Canadian teacher, political scientist, writer, and humorist
Stephen Leacock (musician) of General Fiasco, an indie rock group from Bellaghy, Northern Ireland
Yolande Leacock (born 1991), Trinidadian female tennis player

See also
Lacock
Laycock - surname